Davina Margaret Pratt (born 29 September 1969) is an Irish former cricketer who played as a right-arm medium bowler. She appeared in eight One Day Internationals for Ireland between 1997 and 2002, including playing at the 1997 World Cup.

References

External links 
 
 

1969 births
Living people
Sportspeople from County Cavan
Irish women cricketers
Ireland women One Day International cricketers